Walter Boutwell Gage (April 21, 1872 – 1949) was an American football player and coach. He was an 1894 graduate of Harvard University. During his collegiate days, he lettered for the Harvard Crimson football team in 1891. Gage served as the head football coach at Albion College in Michigan from 1894 to 1895, compiling a record of 8–2–1.

Head coaching record

References

1872 births
1949 deaths
19th-century players of American football
Albion Britons football coaches
Harvard Crimson football players
People from Nashua, New Hampshire
Players of American football from New Hampshire